Peter Stebbings is a Canadian actor, director, producer, and screenwriter best known for portraying Kevin Sharp in the drama series Madison, Paul Deeds in the series Traders, and for writing and directing Defendor. He portrayed Alvin Klein on the science fiction drama series The Listener.

Life and career
Stebbings started practising his trade at the Vancouver Youth Theatre when he was just 12 years old. He worked at various odd jobs growing up, including bus boy and bike courier, before making the serious move to acting. At 22 he went to New York City to study at the Circle in the Square Theater School.

Following his time in New York, he returned to Canada and made his mark playing Kevin Sharp on the hit Canadian series Madison, a role that earned him two Gemini Award nominations as Best Actor in a Continuing Leading Dramatic Role. He also played Paul Deeds in the Canadian series Traders.  He currently has a recurring role on the Canadian series Murdoch Mysteries as industrialist/inventor James Pendrick.

He is married to Charlotte Sullivan.

Filmography

Films

Television

References

External links
 
 Official CTV site for The Listener

Living people
Canadian male film actors
Canadian male screenwriters
Canadian male television actors
Film directors from Vancouver
Male actors from Vancouver
Circle in the Square Theatre School alumni
Film producers from British Columbia
Writers from Vancouver
Canadian Film Centre alumni
20th-century Canadian male actors
21st-century Canadian male actors
1971 births